Lloyd Butler (November 11, 1924 – May 19, 1991) was an American rower, born in Sparks, Nevada, who competed at the 1948 Summer Olympics. He won the gold medal with the American team in the eights competition. Butler attended the University of California, Berkeley, graduating in 1950. While a member of their eight-oared crew, he won the 1949 IRA Regatta, and finished second to Washington in that race in both 1948 and 1950.

References

1924 births
1991 deaths
Sportspeople from Sparks, Nevada
Rowers at the 1948 Summer Olympics
Olympic gold medalists for the United States in rowing
American male rowers
Medalists at the 1948 Summer Olympics